Rocky Branch is a stream entirely within Wayne County, Kentucky. It is a tributary of Kennedy Creek.

Rocky Branch was named for the rocks in and around its course.

See also
List of rivers of Kentucky

References

Rivers of Wayne County, Kentucky
Rivers of Kentucky